HMS Undine was a schooner gunboat of the Royal Navy. Built as the private yacht Morna by Camper and Nicholsons, Gosport and launched in 1869. The schooner was purchased by the Royal Navy on 15 March 1881 and was renamed Undine.

Commenced service on the Australia Station from September 1883 and carried out patrol work and worked as a tender to the flagship . She was sold in Sydney in April 1888 and was renamed Ruby by her new owners. Ruby was wrecked at Escape Pass in the King George Sound, Western Australia on 25 March 1890.

Citations

References
 Bastock, John (1988), Ships on the Australia Station, Child & Associates Publishing Pty Ltd; Frenchs Forest, Australia.

External links
 

1869 ships
Ships built in Gosport
Schooners of the Royal Navy
Shipwrecks of Western Australia